These are the official results of the Women's Individual Road Race at the 1988 Summer Olympics in Seoul, South Korea, held on 26 September 1988.

Final classification

See also
 Men's Individual Road Race

References

External links
 Official Report

Road cycling at the 1988 Summer Olympics
Cycling at the Summer Olympics – Women's road race
1988 in women's road cycling
Cyc